Although the Iran army under the command of Nader Shah besieged Kars belonging to Ottoman Empire on July 29-October 9, 1744, Nishancı Şehla Hacı Ahmed Pasha he was defeated and retreated in the face of the resistance of the Ottoman garrison under the command of Şehla Ahmed Pasha.

Before siege 
After the army of Iran under the command of Nader Shah suffered a major defeat in Siege of Mosul in 1743, Governor of Mosul Abdülcelilzade He made an armistice with Hüseyin Pasha, including the exchange of prisoners. Then, as Governor of Baghdad returned Kirkuk and Erbil to Ottoman Empire, which he occupied by agreement with Ahmed Pasha, Basra also lifted the siege.

In the winter of 1743-1744 Nader Shah engaged in rebellions (some of which were supported/encouraged by the Ottomans). Nadir Shah, who barely neutralized the Lezgin's attacks from Dagestan in December 1743, and within the country, Persian Beylerbeyi Taki Khan's Shiraz and he encountered the Esterabad-based uprisings of the Qajars. Ottoman Empire completed its military preparations on the Iranian front, with the help of Baghdad Governor Ahmed Pasha's distraction policy against Nader Shah, who suppressed them until Nowruz, and Kars Serasker (former Grand Grand Vizier) Şehla Ahmed Pasha, to the Eastern Anatolian Seraskier Aleppo Governor Kazıkchı Hüseyin Paşa and Iraq to the Seraskier Governor of Baghdad Ahmed Pasha was appointed.

Kars Seraskeri Şehla Ahmed Pasha, one of those, was ordered to support the Iranian prince Safi Mirza, who claimed the throne, Nadir Shah's first his goal was to eliminate this danger, and after he caught and blinded Safi Mirza, he sent him to Kars. Then he attacked towards Kars.

Siege 

The Iran army under the command of Nadir Shah crossed Arpaçay via Tabriz-Nakhchivan and arrived in front of Kars on 29 July 1744. After Nadir Shah set up his headquarters on a hill two hours south of the city, he had metrics dug around the Kars fortress and sent a letter to the commander of the Ottoman garrison in the fortress Sehla Ahmed Pasha with an offer to surrender. . In this letter, it was claimed that there was no need for cannon fire for the capture of the castle, because it was sufficient to cut off the water going to the castle.

On the other hand, Serasker Sehla Ahmed Pasha left the offer unanswered. Because the Iranian army of Kars took the necessary defensive measures around the castle before they arrived, made the lake larger by pouring water from Kars stream into Kars lake, had a wide and deep ditch dug around the castle, built two-meter-long trenches with cannons and fortified them with cannons. had formed a line of defense

Despite these preparations, the chain of command in the Ottoman garrison showed weakness and gave the Serasker's order.
When a group of disobedient Ottoman soldiers wanted to leave the castle and attack the Iranian army, Şehla Ahmed Pasha tried to establish order, at least partially, by sending Veli Pasha as a commander. The Ottoman troops were unsuccessful and retreated to the castle.

Thereupon, Nadir Shah, who wanted to tighten the siege, decided to connect Kars with Erzurum.
He moved his headquarters to the village of Kümbet on the Kars-Erzurum road in order to cut him off and started the attacks. However, in 10 general attacks carried out in a month, the Iranian army had to withdraw with heavy losses. Because the Ottomans knew the weaknesses of Nadir Shah and the Iranian army in the siege wars The most severe of these attacks It happened on August 25, 1744, but the Iranians were still unable to break through the Ottoman defense. Two Hans and 1,700 soldiers from the Iranians, two Pashas and 80 soldiers from the Ottomans. soldier died.

Nader Shah, who could not bring down the castle with his attacks, turned to his familiar tactic to cut off the water of the castle. Although he tried to change his bed by blocking the Kars Stream by placing the cotton equivalents he had brought from Revan by camels on 2 September, between the tree stakes, but with the onset of heavy autumn rains, the Kars Stream regained its old bed.

Nader Shah, who could not get results from this tactic, invited the Ottoman ambassador Defterdar Kesriyeli Ahmet Efendi to his headquarters and offered new peace offers, but these were not accepted either.

Thereupon, Nader Shah intensified the siege from 13 September 1744. The Ottoman forces in the castle were deployed as follows: Tırhala Beylerbeyi Murteza Pasha, at the Behrampaşa Gate Ankara, Nevşehir, under the command of the Janissaries in Gözcütepe At the head of the soldiers of the Niğde and Kütahya banners Trabzon Governor Selim Pasha, at the bastion in front of the Mosque Erzurum Governor Veli Pasha, Mustafa Pasha to the right wing, to the western bastion Izmit soldiers, militias, and under the command of Levent, Serasker Sehla Ahmed Pasha was deployed. The camp sergeant commanded the artillery forces placed in front of the hill inside the castle. The hill slopes were held by soldiers from the Alâiye, Karahisar and Icel banners. Bayrakdar Ahmed Pasha, who guarded these troops, was commanding the Timurpasa Bastion metris Karaman Beylerbeyi Abdullah Pasha.

Nâder Shah, leaving his headquarters around Kümbet, approached the castle he had besieged with trenches and towers, and started salvo fire towards Timurpaşa Bastion with field artillery (18 September). He was planning a general offensive the next day. However, the Ottoman garrison left the fortress before dawn and surrounded the Iranian army, which was preparing to attack with the huruç operation they carried out. Leaving all their weight with nine field guns, the Iranian army fled (September 19).

For three weeks following this general attack, the Iranian army took positions in a valley leading towards the castle and continued the bombardment with the fire of 16 large cannons. However, the bombardment did not destroy the fortress, and the onset of severe cold began to increase the losses. Finally, on October 9, 1744, Nader Shah gave the order to withdraw after an unsuccessful siege of 73 days.

References

Citations 

Siege of Kars (1744)
Ottoman–Persian Wars
1744 in the Ottoman Empire
Conflicts in 1744
Sieges involving the Ottoman Empire
Sieges of the Early Modern era